Silat may refer to:
 Silat, the umbrella term for martial arts in Maritime Southeast Asia
 Pencak Silat, the umbrella term for traditional Indonesian martial arts, also the term used for competitive silat in Maritime Southeast Asia region
 Silat Harimau, the Minangkabau style of pencak silat originates from West Sumatra, Indonesia
 Silat Melayu, term refer to martial arts from the Malay Peninsula